Khotang may refer to:
Khotang District, a district in Province No. 1 of Nepal
Khotang 1 (constituency), constituency area of Khotang District
Khotang Bazar, an urban settlement in Khotang District